Coleus caninus, synonym Plectranthus caninus, is a herb from the mint family Lamiaceae, native to southern and eastern Africa from Angola to Sudan and to India and Myanmar.

A plant sold under the name "Coleus canina" or "scaredy cat plant" is supposed to scare off cats and dogs. An attempt to register "Coleus canina" to receive plant variety protection failed as it was considered to be only a clone of Coleus comosus (synonym Plectranthus ornatus).

These plants root easily from cuttings and tolerate mild drought conditions and full sun.

Both the leaves and flowers of the plant are sticky to the touch and have an odor similar to Eucalyptus that some animals find unpleasant, deterring both insect infection and grazing by larger animals.

Subspecies
Two subspecies have been described:
Coleus caninus subsp. caninus – northern Tanzania to Eritrea, India to Myanmar
Coleus caninus subsp. flavovirens (Gürke) A.J.Paton, synonyms Coleus flavovirens, Plectranthus caninus subsp. flavovirens – South Africa to Ethiopia

References

caninus